Massiola is a comune (municipality) in the Province of Verbano-Cusio-Ossola in the Italian region Piedmont, located about  northeast of Turin and about  northwest of Verbania.

Massiola borders the following municipalities: Anzola d'Ossola, Valstrona.

Demographic evolution

References

Cities and towns in Piedmont